The Agadão River (Portuguese: Rio Agadão) is a river in Portugal. The former freguesia of Belazaima do Chão is located on the left bank of the river.

See also 
 List of rivers in Portugal

References 

Rivers of Portugal